The Georgian–Ossetian conflict is an ethno-political conflict over Georgia's former autonomous region of South Ossetia, which evolved in 1989 and developed into a war. Despite a declared ceasefire and numerous peace efforts, the conflict remained unresolved. In August 2008, military tensions and clashes between Georgia and South Ossetian separatists erupted into the Russo-Georgian War. Since then, South Ossetia has been under Russian occupation.

Origins of the conflict

Early years of the Soviet Union

The conflict between Georgian and Ossetians dates back until at least 1918. In the aftermath of the Russian Revolution, Georgia declared independence (26 May 1918) under Mensheviks, while the Bolsheviks took control of Russia. Georgians suppressed a peasant rebellion in the current South Ossetia with great severity in 1918 and in the next year outlawed the National Soviet of South Ossetia and refused to grant autonomy to the region. In June 1920, a Russian-sponsored Ossetian force attacked the Georgian Army and People's Guard. The Georgians responded vigorously and defeated the insurgents, with several Ossetian villages being burnt down and 20,000 Ossetians displaced in Soviet Russia. Eight months later, the Red Army successfully invaded Georgia.

The Soviet Georgian government, established after the Red Army invasion of Georgia in 1921, created an autonomous administrative unit for Transcaucasian Ossetians in April 1922 under pressure from Kavburo (the Caucasian Bureau of the Central Committee of the Russian Communist Party), called the South Ossetian Autonomous Oblast.

Late years of the Soviet Union
In the late 1980s, Ossetian nationalistic organization, Adamon Nikhas (Voice of the People) was created. On 10 November 1989, the South Ossetian Supreme Soviet asked the Supreme Soviet of the Georgian Soviet Socialist Republic for the status of the region to be upgraded to that of autonomous republic. 
However this application was rejected on 16 November and the Georgians besieged Tskhinvali on 23 November 1989.

South Ossetia declared about its state sovereignty on 20 September 1990. In October 1990, the Georgian parliamentary elections were boycotted by South Ossetia, which held elections to its own parliament 
in December of the same year. On 11 December 1990, the Georgian Parliament passed a bill that effectively abolished South Ossetia's autonomous status. Russia intervened and a state of emergency was declared in South Ossetia.

On 4 May 1991, the South Ossetian Parliament declared its intention to separate from Georgia and to unite with North Ossetia, which was located within the borders of the Russian Federation.

Post-Soviet timeline

1991–1992 South Ossetia War

Amidst rising ethnic tensions, war broke out when Georgian forces entered the capital of South Ossetia, Tskhinvali. More than 2,000 people are believed to have been killed in the war. The separatists were helped by former Soviet military units, who by now had come under Russian command. Approximately 100,000 Ossetians fled Georgia proper and South Ossetia, while 23,000 Georgians left South Ossetia. A ceasefire agreement (the Sochi Agreement) was reached on 24 June 1992. While it ended the war, it did not deal with the status of South Ossetia. A Joint Control Commission for Georgian–Ossetian Conflict Resolution and peacekeeping force, composed of Russian, Georgian and Ossetian troops, was set up. The Ossetian de facto government controlled the region independently from Tbilisi. The JPKF's activities were mainly concentrated in the Conflict Zone, which included an area within a 15 km radius from Tskhinvali.

The separatists retained control over the districts of Tskhinvali, Java, Znauri and parts of Akhalgori. The Tbilisi central government controlled the rest of Akhalgori and the Georgian villages in the Tskhinvali district.

1992–2003
In 1996, the Ergneti market was opened and soon became the place where Georgians and South Ossetians traded. In 1996, Lyudvig Chibirov won the presidential elections in South Ossetia. A memorandum on "Measures for providing security and confidence building" was signed in Moscow on 16 May 1996, which was regarded as the first step towards a rapprochement between Georgia and the separatists of South Ossetia. This was followed up by several meetings between the President of Georgia, Eduard Shevardnadze, and the de facto President of South Ossetia, Lyudvig Chibirov. They met in Vladikavkaz in 1996, in Java in 1997, and in Borjomi in 1998. These resulted in some positive developments as the talks about IDP return, economic development, a political solution to the issues, and the protection of the population in the conflict zone.

There was no military confrontation for twelve years. While the peace process was frozen, Ossetians and Georgians engaged in lively exchanges and uncontrolled trade. The unresolved conflict encouraged development of such illegal activities as kidnapping, drug-trafficking and arms trading. Up to the end of 2003, a number of law enforcement officials from South Ossetia and Georgia proper allegedly were participating in criminal economic activities. Authorities on both sides reportedly co-operated to profit from illegal trade, as did Russian customs and peacekeeping troops.

Timeline before 2008

The 2004 flare-up 
 

When Mikheil Saakashvili was elected president in 2004, his goal was to return the breakaway regions of Georgia to central control.

Following the success in Adjara, President Mikheil Saakashvili’s government turned their attention to South Ossetia.

In June, the Georgians shut down the Ergneti market, which was a major trading point for contraband goods. This made the situation more tense. Georgia's regional administration began to restore the alternative road to Didi Liakhvi.

On 7 July, Georgian peacekeepers intercepted a Russian convoy. The next day around 50 Georgian peacekeepers were disarmed and detained by the South Ossetian militias. The Georgian peacekeepers captured were all released on 9 July, with three exceptions. On 11 July 2004, Georgian president Saakashvili said the "crisis in South Ossetia is not a problem between Georgians and Ossetians. This is a problem between Georgia and Russia."

On 5 August 2004, Russian State Duma issued an official statement concerning the aggravation of situation around South Ossetia and Abkhazia in connection "with political actions of Georgian authorities". The statement warned that Russia could get involved in the conflict and would take "appropriate actions in case the lives of Russian citizens were jeopardized". Hundreds of Russian volunteers, mainly Cossacks, stated their readiness to protect the people of South Ossetia should the conflict escalate any further.

The tensions increased on the night of 10–11 August, when Georgian and South Ossetian villages in the area north of Tskhinvali came under fire and civilians were injured. Georgian and South Ossetian members of the JPFK are said to have been involved in the exchange of fire. On 13 August, Georgian Prime Minister Zurab Zhvania and de facto South Ossetian President Eduard Kokoity agreed on a ceasefire, which was breached multiple times by both sides. During the tensions in July and August, 17 Georgians and 5 Ossetians were killed. In emergency sessions of the JCC on 17 and 18 August in Tbilisi and Tskhinvali, the sides debated complex ceasefire proposals and demilitarization projects. At the same time, they expected fighting to resume and used the truce to improve their military positions and strengthen defences. A ceasefire agreement was reached on 19 August.

On 24 August, in an interview broadcast by Imedi television, the chairman of the Georgian parliament's Defense and Security Committee, Givi Targamadze, said that Russian military was prepared to launch a strike into Georgian territory, but the raid was preempted by Saakashvili's decision on 19 August to withdraw Georgian forces from strategic positions in South Ossetia. Targamadze said the Georgian government possessed secretly recorded video of Russian military preparations near the Georgian border.

At a high-level meeting between Georgian Prime Minister Zurab Zhvania and South Ossetian leader Eduard Kokoity on 5 November in Sochi, Russia, an agreement on demilitarization of the conflict zone was reached. Some exchange of fire continued in the zone of conflict after the ceasefire, apparently primarily initiated by the Ossetian side.

New peace efforts
Georgian President Mikheil Saakashvili presented a new vision for resolving the South Ossetian conflict at the Parliamentary Assembly of the Council of Europe (PACE) session in Strasbourg, on 26 January 2005. His proposal included broader forms of autonomy, including a constitutional guarantee of free and directly elected local self-governance. Saakashvili stated that South Ossetia's parliament would have control over issues such as culture, education, social policy, economic policy, public order, organization of local self-governance and environmental protection. At the same time South Ossetia would have a voice in the national structures of government as well, with a constitutional guarantee of representation in the judicial and constitutional-judicial branches and in the Parliament. Georgia would commit to improving the economic and social conditions of South Ossetian inhabitants. Saakashvili proposed a transitional 3-year conflict resolution period, during which time mixed Georgian and Ossetian police forces, under the guidance and auspices of international organizations, would be established and Ossetian forces would gradually be integrated into a united Georgian Armed Force. Saakashvili also said that the international community should play a more significant and visible role in solving this conflict.

Zurab Zhvania's premature death in February 2005 was a setback in the conflict resolution.

2006 attack on a Georgian helicopter
On 3 September 2006, the South Ossetian forces opened fire at a Georgian MI-8 helicopter carrying Defense Minister of Georgia, Irakli Okruashvili, when it flew over the separatist-held territory. It landed safely in Georgian government-controlled territory. Although the South Ossetian authorities reported that the Georgian helicopter had entered their air space and fired shots at the ground, the Georgians denied the charge that shots had come from the helicopter. The South Ossetian officials confirmed their troops were responsible for the attack, but denied the claim that the aircraft was targeted because of prior intelligence that Okruashvili was on board. "We are not interested in having either Okruashvili or [Georgian president Mikheil] Saakashvili killed, as they are helping us to achieve independence," declared South Ossetian Interior minister Mikhail Mindzayev.

2006 October incident
On 31 October 2006, the South Ossetian police reported a skirmish in the Java, Georgia district, in which they killed a group of 4 men. The weapons seized from the group included assault rifles, guns, grenade launchers, grenades and explosive devices. Other items found in the militants' possession included extremist Wahhabi literature, maps of Java district and sets of Russian peacekeeping uniforms. Those findings led the South Ossetian authorities to conclude that the militants were planning to carry out acts of sabotage and terrorist attacks. The South Ossetian authorities identified the men as Chechens from Georgia's Pankisi Gorge. South Ossetia accused Georgia of hiring the Chechen mercenaries to carry out terrorist attacks in the region.

The Georgian side flatly denied its involvement in the incident. Shota Khizanishvili, a spokesperson for the Georgian Interior Ministry, supposed that the incident could be connected to "internal conflicts in South Ossetia".

Rival elections of 2006
On 12 November 2006, presidential election and referendum were held in South Ossetia. The separatist-controlled part of the region re-elected Eduard Kokoity as de facto president and voted for independence from Georgia. In the areas under Georgia's control, the Ossetian opposition organized rival polls electing Dmitry Sanakoyev as an alternative president and voted for negotiations with Georgia on a future federal agreement. The pro-Georgian government was never able to draw significant support away from the separatist authorities.

Georgia's new initiative
On 29 March 2007, the Russian Foreign Ministry warned in a statement that Tbilisi's plan to set up a temporary administrative unit in the part of breakaway South Ossetia would "shatter an already fragile situation". On 10 May 2007, Dmitry Sanakoyev was appointed as head of the Provisional Administrative Entity of South Ossetia by the President of Georgia. The next day, Sanakoyev addressed the Parliament of Georgia, outlining his vision of the conflict resolution plan. In response the South Ossetian separatists enforced mass blockade of Georgian villages in the conflict zone and Eduard Kokoity demanded the withdrawal of Georgian special-task troops and South Ossetia's interim government headed by "alternative president" Dmitry Sanakoyev.

On 24 July 2007, Tbilisi held its first state commission to define South Ossetia's status within the Georgian state. Chaired by Georgian Prime Minister Zurab Noghaideli, the commission included Georgian parliamentarians, representatives of the Ossetian community in Georgia and representatives of several Georgian human rights organisations. The talks were held with Sanakoyev's administration.

Sanakoyev's supporters launched a campaign against Kokoity named "Kokoity Fandarast" ("Goodbye Kokoity" in Ossetian language).

Tsitelubani missile incident 2007

Georgian officials said that Russian attack aircraft, an SU-24 Fencer, violated its airspace and fired Raduga Kh-58 anti-radar tactically guided missile. Russia denied the allegations. The group of defense specialists from the United States, Sweden, Latvia and Lithuania stated late on 15 August that the plane flew from Russian to Georgian airspace and back three times.

Events in 2008

Pre-war clashes
Events prior to August 2008 are described in 2008 Russo-Georgian diplomatic crisis.

2008 War in South Ossetia 

Tensions between Georgia and Russia began escalating in April 2008. Fighting began in the night of June 14-15th 2008 when mortar fire and an exchange of fire broke out between South Ossetian and Georgian forces. South Ossetia claimed that mortar fire was launched from Georgian-controlled villages on Tskhinvali, the South Ossetian capital, and that their forces were responding to fire from Georgian forces on the outskirts of the capital. Georgia denied firing the first shot, saying instead that South Ossetia had attacked the Georgian-controlled villages of Ergneti, Nikozi and Prisi. Fighting further escalated when South Ossetian separatists fired upon a Georgian military vehicle on 1 August 2008. The explosion wounded five Georgian peacekeepers. In response, Georgian snipers assaulted the South Ossetian militiamen during the evening. Ossetian separatists began shelling Georgian villages on 1 August, with a sporadic response from Georgian peacekeepers and other troops in the region. Serious incidents happened in the following week after Ossetian attacks on Georgian villages and positions in South Ossetia.

At around 19:00 on 7 August 2008, Georgian president Mikheil Saakashvili announced a unilateral ceasefire and no-response order. However, South Ossetian separatists intensified their attacks on Georgian villages located in the South Ossetian conflict zone. Georgian troops returned fire and advanced towards the capital of the self-proclaimed Republic of South Ossetia, Tskhinvali, during the night of 8 August. According to Russian military expert Pavel Felgenhauer, the Ossetians were intentionally provoking the Georgians, so Russia would use the Georgian response as a pretext for premeditated military invasion. According to Georgian intelligence, and several Russian media reports, parts of the regular (non-peacekeeping) Russian Army had already moved to South Ossetian territory through the Roki Tunnel before the Georgian military operation.

The centre of Tskhinvali was reached by 1,500 men of the Georgian ground forces by 10:00 on 8 August. One Georgian diplomat told Kommersant on the same day that by taking control of Tskhinvali they wanted to demonstrate that Georgia wouldn't tolerate killing of Georgian citizens. Russia accused Georgia of aggression against South Ossetia, and launched a large-scale invasion of Georgia under the guise of peacekeeping operation on 8 August. Russian military captured Tskhinvali in five days and expelled Georgian forces. Russia also launched airstrikes against military infrastructure in Georgia. Abkhaz forces opened a second front by attacking the Kodori Gorge, held by Georgia. Russian forces occupied the Georgian cities of Zugdidi, Senaki, Poti and Gori (the last one after the ceasefire was negotiated). Russian Black Sea Fleet blockaded the Georgian coast.

Both during and after the war, South Ossetian forces and irregular militia conducted a campaign of ethnic cleansing against Georgians in South Ossetia, with Georgian villages around Tskhinvali being destroyed after the war had ended. The war displaced 192,000 people, and while many were able to return to their homes after the war, a year later around 30,000 ethnic Georgians remained displaced. In an interview published in Kommersant, South Ossetian leader Eduard Kokoity said he would not allow Georgians to return.

President of France Nicolas Sarkozy negotiated a ceasefire agreement on 12 August 2008. On 17 August, Russian president Dmitry Medvedev announced that Russian forces would begin to pull out of Georgia the following day. Russian forces withdrew from the buffer zones adjacent to Abkhazia and South Ossetia on 8 October and control over them was transferred to the European Union Monitoring Mission in Georgia.

After the 2008 war
On 26 August 2008, Russia officially recognized both South Ossetia and Abkhazia as independent states.

In 2015, the prosecutor of the International Criminal Court requested authorisation from the court's judges to begin an investigation into the alleged war crimes in relation to the conflict. This case includes alleged crimes committed as part of a campaign to expel ethnic Georgians from South Ossetia as well as attacks on peacekeepers by Georgian and South Ossetian forces.

Russian and Ossetian troops expanded the border into Georgia, evicting ethnic Georgians from their homes.

There have been several proposals on South Ossetia joining Russia following the war. The latest dates back to 2022.

2019 Chorchana-Tsnelisi Crisis 
On 24–25 August, 2019, tensions mounted at the administrative boundary line in South Ossetia as the Georgian police erected a checkpoint between the villages of Chorchana and Tsnelisi in response to ongoing Russian–South Ossetian demarcation works. On 29 August, movement of military equipment and personnel was noticed near Chorchana. South Ossetian official Egor Kochiev demanded immediate dismantling of Georgian police checkpoint, otherwise warning that South Ossetia would take "legal measures". Georgian officials responded by saying that Georgia does not accepts "the language of ultimatums". The State Security Service of Georgia stated that the checkpoint was erected on Georgian-controlled territory and its up to Georgian government to decide where to place police checkpoint on Georgian territory. The Ministry of Foreign Affairs of Georgia called on de facto South Ossetian authorities to stop provocations and unlawful demarcation works. On 29 August, South Ossetian officials abruptly left the meeting with Georgian government conducted in Incident Prevention and Response Mechanism (IPRM) format.

In September, the South Ossetian authorities closed all crossing points with the Georgian government-controlled territory, aggravating humanitarian situation in the region and placing some 2,500 ethnic Georgians remaining in the Akhalgori district at a particular risk. 

Representatives of Tbilisi, Moscow and Tskhinvali continued discussing the situation during a series of "technical meetings", but serious security challenges remained. Georgian officials have refused to have any talks about placement of police checkpoints on Georgian controlled territory.

See also
 Abkhaz–Georgian conflict
 East Prigorodny Conflict
 Georgian Civil War
 Georgia–South Ossetia border
 International recognition of Abkhazia and South Ossetia
 Politics of Georgia
 Russo-Georgian War
 South Ossetian independence referendum, 2006
 Transnistria conflict

References

 
Wars involving Georgia (country)
Georgia (country)–Russia relations
Territorial disputes of Georgia (country)
Conflicts in 2022
Proxy wars
Military of South Ossetia